The 2008 Rally México, officially 22º Corona Rally México, was the third round of the 2008 World Rally Championship season. The rally was held on February 29 — March 2 and began with a ceremonial start on Thursday, February 28. It was the first gravel event of the season and also the opening round of the Junior World Rally Championship this season.

The event 
The rally consisted of 20 special stages, one of which was cancelled due to safety reasons, as there were too many spectators gathered around the road. Also five of the stages were Super Special Stages. Some of the sections were placed as high as 2700 meters over sea level, causing significant engine power loss due to lower air pressure.

The event was won by the previous edition's winner, Sébastien Loeb. Before the rally there was some controversy with Citroën Team changing the engine in his car after a major malfunction during the shakedown, but the team reverted to the original unit and avoided a five minutes penalty. The first rally leader was Jari-Matti Latvala, but after having to be the opening driver on the second day's stages and suffering from the broken intercooler pipe, causing the turbo to overheat and break, he dropped to third. Subaru's Chris Atkinson finished second after constant pace placing him in the top eight on every stage, achieving the best result in his career so far. Fourth overall was Mikko Hirvonen who lost large amounts of time after a few punctures and having to change a wheel in his Ford Focus RS WRC 07. Henning Solberg lost his battle for fourth with Hirvonen and had to settle for fifth after damaging his damper.  The rest of pointing drivers were Matthew Wilson, Federico Villagra, both in Focuses 2007 spec and privateer Ricardo Triviño driving a Peugeot 206 WRC. Petter Solberg managed to score the last point in Manufacturers' Championship, even though having to restart under SupeRally format after having mechanical problems with the front left driveshaft in his Subaru Impreza WRC2007 on SS10. Citroën's number two, Daniel Sordo, came back into the fight after breaking the suspension in his C4 WRC and retiring too, but even though he won 3 stages overall, he wasn't able to regain the penalty he was given.

Suzuki drivers suffered from mechanical problems during the first day and both Toni Gardemeister and Per-Gunnar Andersson had to retire from the rally for good. Also Stobart's Gigi Galli wasn't able to finish the event - the Italian had to retire from top-eight position after breaking the suspension in his Ford Focus.

The top eight was followed by the JWRC podium - Frenchman Sebastien Ogier in Citroën C2 S1600, Estonian Jaan Mölder and Pole Michał Kościuszko, both in Suzuki Swifts S1600.

Result change 
Mexican Ricardo Triviño was disqualified during the second day of the event for using non-homologated driving gloves; he was able to complete the rally after deciding to appeal his case to higher jurisdiction. His request was later rejected and Triviño was excluded from the event, which resulted in Sebastien Ogier, WRC debutant, to score one point in drivers' championship. It was the first time in World Rally history that JWRC driver driving Super 1600 front-wheel drive rally car scored points in overall classification.

Results

Special stages 
All dates and times are CST (UTC-6).

Footnotes
 A  all times local

Championship standings after the event

Drivers' championship

Manufacturers' championship

Junior championship

References

External links 

 Results at eWRC-results.com
 Results at official page WRC.com

Mexico
Rally Mexico
Rally